This is a list of events from British radio in 1958.

Events
 29 March – The first averaged BBC Top 20 chart is broadcast on Pick of the Pops.
 1 April – BBC Radiophonic Workshop created.
 22 April – "Sunday Afternoon at Home", one of the most famous episodes of the comedy radio series Hancock's Half Hour, is  broadcast on the BBC Light Programme for the first time.
 29 September – The BBC Light Programme's broadcasting hours are extended once again, now going on air 30 minutes earlier, at 6:30 a.m.

Programme debuts

Continuing radio programmes
1930s
 In Town Tonight (1933–1960)

1940s
 Music While You Work (1940–1967)
 Sunday Half Hour (1940–2018)
 Desert Island Discs (1942–Present)
 Family Favourites (1945–1980)
 Down Your Way (1946–1992)
 Have A Go (1946–1967)
 Housewives' Choice (1946–1967)
 Letter from America (1946–2004)
 Woman's Hour (1946–Present)
 Twenty Questions (1947–1976)
 Any Questions? (1948–Present)
 Mrs Dale's Diary (1948–1969)
 Take It from Here (1948–1960)
 Billy Cotton Band Show (1949–1968)
 A Book at Bedtime (1949–Present)
 Ray's a Laugh (1949–1961)

1950s
 The Archers (1950–Present)
 Educating Archie (1950–1960)
 Listen with Mother (1950–1982)
 The Goon Show (1951–1960)
 Hancock's Half Hour (1954–1959)
 From Our Own Correspondent (1955–Present)
 Pick of the Pops (1955–Present)
 The Clitheroe Kid (1957–1972)
 My Word! (1957–1988)
 Test Match Special (1957–Present)
 The Today Programme'' (1957–Present)

Station debuts

Births
 29 January – Linda Smith, comedian (died 2006)
 12 February – Michael Fenton Stevens, comic actor
 3 May – Sandi Toksvig, Danish-born British comic performer
 14 May – Jan Ravens, actress and impressionist
 29 June – Mark Radcliffe, radio broadcaster
 30 July – Liz Kershaw, presenter
 21 September – Simon Mayo, presenter
 11 December – Pete Mitchell, presenter (died 2020)
 Shaun Prendergast, actor

Deaths

See also 
 1958 in British music
 1958 in British television
 1958 in the United Kingdom
 List of British films of 1958
 O'Gorman

References 

 
Years in British radio
Radio